Rock Mountain is a name used to describe two different mountains located in the North Georgia mountains that are in two different Georgia counties.

Floyd County
 Rock Mountain  is a  mountain located west of Armuchee, Georgia. It was named for its rocky peak. It is the location of the Rocky Mountain Project and the Rocky Mountain Hydroelectric Plant.

Rabun County
A  mountain called Black Rock Mountain is located on the eastern Continental Divide in north central Rabun County not far from the highest point in the county, Rabun Bald.
 Rock Mountain, elevation , is located on the west bank of the Tallulah River  near its confluence with the Coleman River.

References 

Mountains of Georgia (U.S. state)
Mountains of Floyd County, Georgia
Mountains of Rabun County, Georgia